was the second daimyō of the tozama feudal domain of Takabatake, in Dewa Province, northern Japan. He was later transferred to become first daimyō of Tendō Domain in the same province. Oda Nobukazu was a direct descendant of the famed Oda Nobunaga, through Nobunaga's son Oda Nobukatsu.

Biography
Nobukazu was born as the ninth son of Oda Nobuchika and the daughter of Ogasawara Nagayuki. His childhood name was Hyaku-tarō. His wife was the third daughter of Ōmura Sumiyasu, daimyō of Ōmura Domain in Kyūshū, and his concubine was the fourth daughter of Toda Takanaka of Utsunomiya Domain. He had three sons and three daughters.

On November 1, 1811, he had an audience with the shōgun Tokugawa Ienari. In 1818, on the death of his father, he succeeded to the lordship of Takabatake, and received the ceremonial court title of Wakasa-no-kami and lower 5th Court rank in 1820. In 1826, after the castle at Takabatake had burned down for a second time, he was ordered by the bakufu to shift its location to Tendō, a largely undeveloped forested and mountainous region within the territory of the same domain, where he ruled as first lord of Tendō from 1830–1936. His ceremonial court title was changed to Echizen-no-kami. His grave is at the Buddhist temple of Korin-ji in Bunkyo-ku, Tokyo.

|-

|-

1793 births
1836 deaths
Samurai
Daimyo
Oda clan